This is a list of monarchs who have reigned over the Pacific island of Niue. The island today is a self-governing territory in free association with New Zealand, and recognises the Sovereign in Right of New Zealand as the head of state. Before this, however, the island previously had an indigenous monarchy, established around the beginning of the 18th century.

Before that time, there appears to have been no national government or national leader in Niue. Chiefs and heads of family exercised authority over segments of the population. Around 1700, the concept and practice of kingship appears to have been introduced through contact with Samoa or Tonga. From then on, a succession of patu-iki (kings) ruled the island, the first of whom was Puni-mata. The monarch was non-hereditary; patu-iki were reportedly elected by the Niuean population, with the candidates being issued from influential families. As described by Percy Smith in 1903, Niue appears therefore to have been a democratic elective monarchy.

List of patu-iki

Imperial rule and free association

From 1900 to 1901, Niue was ruled by the United Kingdom. In 1901, the island was annexed by New Zealand, which administered it in the name of the British Empire. On 26 September 1907, New Zealand attained the status of dominion, becoming the Dominion of New Zealand, and the British monarch from then on reigned over Niue in his or her capacity as monarch of New Zealand. Elizabeth II was the first monarch to be explicitly titled Queen of New Zealand, however, in 1952. Today, Niue is part of the Realm of New Zealand, the successor political entity to the dominion.

List of British monarchs reigning over Niue

List of New Zealand monarchs reigning over Niue

Sources
S. Percy Smith, Niuē-fekai (or Savage) Island and its People, 1903, pp. 36–44

History of Niue
Monarchy in New Zealand
Politics of Niue
Monarchs
Niue
List